Mark McCabe (born 10 May 1978) is an Irish music producer, remixer, radio DJ and club DJ, from Dublin. In 2000, he released "Maniac 2000" and it went to number one, as the second biggest-selling record ever in Ireland. In 2017, McCabe teamed up with the Sunset Bros, to release the record "I'm Feelin It", which went on to hit thirty million streams on Spotify.

McCabe has mixed the opening sequence for events, such as the Special Olympics in 2003, the 2005 and 2007 Saint Patrick's Festivals Skyfest. He has also done remixes for James Arthur, Gavin James, Ozark Henry and Dagny.

Musical career
During the 1990s, McCabe presented the drivetime show on a pirate radio station in Dublin. He was signed with New York tribal house legends Twisted Records. In 2000, he released Maniac 2000 and it went to number 1, as the second biggest-selling record ever in Ireland. McCabe's music successes includes two Meteor Music awards, two top 10 singles and the second-biggest selling record in Ireland. McCabe collaborated in 2017 with the Sunset Bros, to release the record "Im Feeling It", which went on to hit four million streams on Spotify; his 2016 remix of "Nervous (The Ooh Song)" has been streamed over 172 million times to date and certified double platinum in Ireland, Sweden, Norway and Netherlands.

McCabe formerly served as a radio DJ and Head of Music at RTE 2fm and now serves as a radio DJ at iRadio.

Discography

Singles

Awards

References

Living people
Irish DJs
DJs from Dublin (city)
Radio personalities from the Republic of Ireland
1978 births
Electronic dance music DJs
Irish electronic musicians
Irish dance musicians